A show house, also called a model home or display home, is a term for a "display" version of manufactured homes, or houses in a subdivision. They are used on newly built developments to show the living space and features of homes available. Show homes are often built in such a way that they can be sold like any other house, and as such are connected to electrical and telephone cables and have functioning water systems.

They almost always are equipped with full furnishings, including appliances and interior decoration ("staging") to allow prospective buyers to more easily visualize what the house would look like when lived in. Once the home is ultimately put up for sale, many builders will give buyers the option to buy the home in its fully furnished state.

In model homes that have attached garages (which is common among homes in subdivisions), the garage is usually completely finished to look like another room of the house, making it viable office space for the salespeople working at the model. This is often the first thing that prospective buyers see when entering the home, making it a "lobby" of sorts. Once the home is purchased and the model closes, this area is then gutted and made into an actual garage.

See also

Architectural model

References

House types
Selling techniques
Residential real estate